Windsor Drive is a 2015 American psychological thriller film directed by Natalie Bible' in her directorial debut.

Premise
River Miller (Tommy O'Reilly), a mentally unstable actor haunted by the past, moves to Hollywood to start his life over, only to find his inner demons are inescapable.

Cast
 Tommy O'Reilly as River
 Samaire Armstrong as Brooke
 Mandy Musgrave as June
 Jillian Murray as Jordana
 Matt Cohen as Matt
 Anna Gurji as Ivy
 Brieanna Steele as Liz 
 Kyan DuBois as Wulfric
 Maetrix Fitten as Randy

References

External links
 
 

2015 films
American psychological thriller films
2015 psychological thriller films
2015 directorial debut films
2010s English-language films
2010s American films